Ei Thinzar Maung (Burmese: အိသဉ္ဇာမောင်, born 11 September 1994) is a Burmese activist and politician. She is the incumbent Deputy Minister of Women, Youths and Children Affairs of the National Unity Government.

She has appeared on the Time 100  for 2021, along with Esther Ze Naw.

Early life and career
Ei Thinzar Maung was born on 11 September 1994. She obtained a Diploma of Foreign Language at Mandalay University.

Political career
She has been an activist since 2012, focusing on minority issues and joined the All Burma Federation of Student Unions.

On March 6, 2015, she was arrested by police during a protest to amend the 2014 Myanmar Education Law in Letpadan. In the same day, she was released. She was re-arrested on March 10, and was imprisoned in Thayawaddy Prison. She released in 2016, the same year she chaired the 2016 Student General Assembly. She later served as the President of the Student Union of Yadanabon University.

She contested for Pabedan Township under the banner of the Democratic Party for a New Society (DPNS) at the 2020 election but was not elected. She was among the first to lead anti-coup protests in Yangon five days after the military coup in February 2021.

Awards 
In 2022, Maung received the International Women of Courage Award from the United States Department of State.

References

External links 
 Ei Thinzar Maung on Facebook

1994 births
Living people
Burmese politicians
Burmese activists
Mandalay University alumni
Recipients of the International Women of Courage Award